LeTourneau can refer to:

R.G. LeTourneau, U.S. businessperson, inventor and academic
 LeTourneau University, university founded by R. G. LeTourneau
LeTourneau Empowering Global Solutions (LEGS), non-profit based in Longview, Texas
 LeTourneau Technologies, a manufacturing machines company
Fanny Létourneau, Canadian synchronized swimmer
Orgues Létourneau, Canadian pipe organ builder
Mary Kay Letourneau, former teacher and child rapist